Quaglino may refer to:

 Alfredo Quaglino (1894-1972), Italian photographer, journalist, and motor racer
 Quaglino's, a restaurant in London, founded by Giovanni "John" Quaglino in 1929